Alan Garner (born 1934) is an English novelist.

Alan Garner may also refer to:
 Alan Garner (politician) (1929–1996), British politician
 Alan Garner (footballer) (1951–2020), English footballer
 Alan Garner, character in the film The Hangover